Q+A is an Australian television program broadcast on ABC TV, hosted by journalist Hamish Macdonald. Prior to 2020 the show was hosted by Tony Jones. Each episode usually consists of five panellists, usually one current Federal Labor politician, one current Federal Liberal–National Coalition politician, and three other politicians (current or former), authors, journalists, or personalities.

Season 1: 2008
This was the first season of the program, comprising 20 episodes. The most any one person appeared in this series was twice. The first episode featured Prime Minister Kevin Rudd as the only guest, and was announced as a one-off special. However, on episode 19, Q&A again featured just one panellist, the new leader of the Liberal Party Malcolm Turnbull, who had won a leadership ballot just 9 days before.

Season 2: 2009
This was the second season of the program, totalling 16 episodes. As with season one, no panellist appeared in this season more than twice. Episode 7 of this series was broadcast live from Melbourne, the first time the program was filmed outside its Ultimo studio in Sydney. Episode 14 was also broadcast from another location, this time from the National Museum of Australia in Canberra for an Australian federal budget special with the finance minister and shadow treasurer.

Season 3: 2009
The third season of Q&A began on 23 July 2009. Episode 6 was broadcast from the Melbourne Writers Festival with three writers on the panel. Episode 10 was broadcast from Adelaide. Episode 11 had no politician on the panel.

Season 4: 2010
The fourth season of Q&A began on 8 February 2010, and will be a full season consisting of 40 episodes on the new night, Monday, on ABC1. Episode 1 was broadcast from Old Parliament House, Canberra, with an audience of 16- to 25-year-olds. Episode 4 was broadcast from the Adelaide Festival of Arts, and had a total of 6 panellists making it the largest panel in the program's history. The following episode also had 6 panellists.

Episode 9 featured Opposition Leader Tony Abbott as the only panellist. Episode 12 was a 'politician-free' episode, where no current or former politicians were on the panel. Also in episode 12, a Twitter feed was introduced, where selected tweets discussing Q&A are shown on screen. Episode 18 featured six panellists and was broadcast from Casula in south west Sydney. On episode 24, Tanya Plibersek became the first panellist to appear on Q&A more than twice in one season (only if you consider 2009's programmes to be two seasons – both Tony Abbott and Joe Hockey appeared four times in the full year of 2009 with five other panellists appeared three times that year).

Episode 27 and 28 each featured the two leaders alone on the panel, in the final two episodes before the election. Episode 29 was the first episode following the election, and was controversial in that at the last minute Julia Gillard pulled Mark Arbib from appearing on the panel, and an empty chair was left on the panel for the entire episode. Episode 30 was broadcast from the Melbourne Writers Festival.

Episode 37 featured former Prime Minister John Howard as the only panellist, co-inciding with the launch of his memoirs, Lazarus Rising. Episode 38 was the first time the program was broadcast from Western Australia in Perth.

Nick Minchin was originally supposed to be the Coalition panellist on the season finale, but bad weather prohibited his plane from landing in Sydney on time. Minchin was replaced on the panel by George Brandis.

Season 5: 2011
The fifth season of Q&A began on 7 February 2011, continuing in its Monday night timeslot. The exceptions to this were the twelfth and twenty-third episodes, which aired on Thursday 28 April and 7 July respectively. The first special was a special discussion preceding the Wedding of Prince William and Catherine Middleton, which the second special was entitled "Stopping The Boats" and was centred on the topic of asylum seekers. During this season, Christopher Pyne was the first panellist to appear ten times since Season One, and Lachlan Harris was the 250th unique panellist since Season One.

Season 6: 2012
The sixth season of Q&A began on 6 February 2012.

Season 7: 2013
This season was the first to feature international broadcasts, with the show travelling to Jakarta and India. The 11 November show featured the 500th unique panellist to appear on the show. If you count it in order of introduction, Graham Bradley was the 500th.

Season 8: 2014
On 29 September, Christopher Pyne became the first panellist to appear 20 times since Season One. On 7 April, the show travelled to Shanghai and on 4 August the first outdoor show was conducted in Arnhem Land at the Garma Festival.

Season 9: 2015
On 16 February, Malcolm Turnbull became the first guest to appear 21 times on the show. To celebrate International Woman's Day a special episode of Q&A was held, hosted by Annabel Crabb and featuring an all-female panel. Virginia Trioli guest hosted the program twice, on 27 July and 24 August.

Season 10: 2016

Season 11: 2017

Season 12: 2018

Season 13: 2019

Season 14: 2020

Season 15: 2021

Season 16: 2022

External links
 Episodes by date on ABC website

ABC News and Current Affairs
Lists of celebrities